Goodbye to You may refer to:

"Goodbye to You" (Michelle Branch song)
"Goodbye to You" (Roxette song)
"Goodbye to You" (Scandal song), also covered by The Veronicas
"Goodbye To You", by Breaking Point from Beautiful Disorder and Marvel's Fantastic Four: Original Soundtrack
"Goodbye to You", by Screeching Weasel from You Broke My Fucking Heart
"Goodbye to You", by Zox from Take Me Home